The Assistant Secretary of State for Arms Control, Verification and Compliance is the head of the Bureau of Arms Control, Verification and Compliance. The position was created on December 12, 1999, by Secretary Albright as the Assistant Secretary of State for Verification and Compliance. The Bureau became fully operational on February 1, 2000, and was first known as the Verification and Compliance Bureau. Within the department, the Assistant Secretary is responsible for all matters relating to the supervision of verification and compliance with international arms control, nonproliferation, and disarmament agreements.  The bureau was given its current name during the Obama administration.

President Joe Biden nominated lawyer and arms control expert Mallory Stewart for the position on June 2, 2021; she was confirmed by the Senate on March 29, 2022, and was sworn in on April 18, 2022.

The Assistant Secretary advises the Secretary of State and the Under Secretary for Arms Control and International Security/Senior Adviser to the President and the Secretary of State for Arms Control, Nonproliferation and Disarmament on the appropriate uses of the "Key Verification Assets Fund," and manages the fund.

The Assistant Secretary is also responsible for the President's Annual Report to Congress on Adherence to and Compliance with Arms Control Agreements, for Verifiability Assessments for all international arms control and nonproliferation agreements, and for specialized compliance reports required by U.S. Senate Resolutions of ratification, such as the Chemical Weapons Convention and the Non-Proliferation Treaty.

Assistant Secretaries of State for Arms Control, Verification and Compliance

References

External links
The Bureau of Arms Control, Verification and Compliance at the Department of State website
The Bureau of Verification and Compliance archives
(http://www.state.gov/r/pa/prs/ps/2010/10/148521.htm Press Release: The Department of State's Reorganization of the Arms Control and International Security Bureaus)